Wild Horse Canyon is a 1925 American silent Western film directed by Ben F. Wilson and starring Yakima Canutt, Helene Rosson and Edward Cecil.

Cast
 Yakima Canutt as Yak Dawson
 Helene Rosson as Marie Wolcamp
 Edward Cecil as Rodney Roland
 Slim Talbot as Ted Edland 
 Cliff Lyons as Ranch Hand 
 Boy asStallion Boy - a Wild Horse

References

Bibliography
 Connelly, Robert B. The Silents: Silent Feature Films, 1910-36, Volume 40, Issue 2. December Press, 1998.
 Munden, Kenneth White. The American Film Institute Catalog of Motion Pictures Produced in the United States, Part 1. University of California Press, 1997.
 Pitts, Michael R. Western Movies: A Guide to 5,105 Feature Films. McFarland, 2012.

External links
 

1925 films
1925 Western (genre) films
1920s English-language films
American silent feature films
Silent American Western (genre) films
American black-and-white films
Films directed by Ben F. Wilson
1920s American films